Stanley R. Greenberg (1927-2002) was an American playwright and screenwriter. He was an important pioneer in the format of docudrama.

He was born in Chicago, served in World War II and graduated from Brown University. He got his start in television writing for the series The Defenders and The Nurses.

Select Credits
Skyjacked (1972)
Welcome Home, Johnny Bristol (1972)
Soylent Green (1973)
Pueblo (1973) (TV movie)
The Missiles of October (1974) (TV movie)
Blind Ambition (1979) (TV movie)

References

External links
Stanley R Greenberg at IMDb
Obituary at Chicago Tribune

1927 births
2002 deaths
20th-century American screenwriters
Brown University alumni
Nebula Award winners